Cape North is a headland at the northeastern end of Cape Breton Island. It is in the jurisdiction of the Municipality of the County of Victoria, Nova Scotia Canada.

Cape North contains the landforms Pollett's Cove, Wilkie Sugar Loaf and the Aspy Fault and the unincorporated areas of South Harbour, and Dingwall.

The Miꞌkmaq called it Uktutuncok, meaning "Highest Mountain".

Cape North is claimed to have been the "prema tiera vista" or first land seen by explorer John Cabot. Despite the ongoing dispute, the event is commemorated by Cabots Landing Provincial Park.

Cape North Lighthouse was built in 1874, and a fog alarm added in 1906. It was destaffed in 1989, and replaced with a modern beacon in 2010.

External links
North Highlands Community Museum and Culture Centre

References 

North
Landforms of Victoria County, Nova Scotia